Claire Sutton may refer to:

 Claire Sutton (QVC presenter) (born 1967), British television presenter
 Claire Sutton (Yes Prime Minister), a character in the British stage play Yes Prime Minister